The National Road (also known as the Cumberland Road) was the first major improved highway in the United States built by the federal government. Built between 1811 and 1837, the  road connected the Potomac and Ohio Rivers and was a main transport path to the West for thousands of settlers. When improved in the 1830s, it became the second U.S. road surfaced with the macadam process pioneered by Scotsman John Loudon McAdam.

Construction began heading west in 1811 at Cumberland, Maryland, on the Potomac River.

The road has also been referred to as the Cumberland Turnpike, the Cumberland–Brownsville Turnpike (or Road or Pike), the Cumberland Pike, the National Pike, and the National Turnpike.

In the 20th century with the advent of the automobile, the National Road was connected with other historic routes to California under the title, National Old Trails Road. Today, much of the alignment is followed by U.S. Route 40 (US 40), with various portions bearing the Alternate U.S. Route 40 (Alt. US 40) designation, or various state-road numbers (such as Maryland Route 144 for several sections between Baltimore and Cumberland).

In 1976, the American Society of Civil Engineers designated the National Road as a National Historic Civil Engineering Landmark. In 2002, the entire road, including extensions east to Baltimore and west to St. Louis, was designated the Historic National Road, an All-American Road.

History

Braddock Road
The Braddock Road had been opened by the Ohio Company in 1751 between Fort Cumberland, the limit of navigation on the upper Potomac River, and the French military station at Fort Duquesne at the forks of the Ohio River, (at the confluence of the Allegheny and Monongahela Rivers), an important trading and military point where the city of Pittsburgh now stands. It received its name during the colonial-era French and Indian War of 1753–1763 (also known as the Seven Years' War in Europe), when it was constructed by British General Edward Braddock, who was accompanied by Colonel George Washington of the Virginia militia regiment in the ill-fated July 1755 Braddock expedition, an attempt to assault the French-held Fort Duquesne.

Cumberland Road

Construction of the Cumberland Road (which later became part of the longer National Road) was authorized on March 29, 1806, by Congress. The new Cumberland Road would replace the wagon and foot paths of the Braddock Road for travel between the Potomac and Ohio Rivers, following roughly the same alignment until just east of Uniontown, Pennsylvania. From there, where the Braddock Road turned north towards Pittsburgh, the new National Road/Cumberland Road continued west to Wheeling, Virginia (now West Virginia), also on the Ohio River.

The contract for the construction of the first section was awarded to Henry McKinley on May 8, 1811, and construction began later that year, with the road reaching Wheeling on August 1, 1818. For more than 100 years, a simple granite stone was the only marker of the road's beginning in Cumberland, Maryland. In June 2012, a monument and plaza were built in that town's Riverside Park, next to the historic original starting point.

Beyond the National Road's eastern terminus at Cumberland and toward the Atlantic coast, a series of private toll roads and turnpikes were constructed, connecting the National Road (also known as the Old National Pike) with Baltimore, then the third-largest city in the country, and a major maritime port on Chesapeake Bay. Completed in 1824, these feeder routes formed what is referred to as an eastern extension of the federal National Road.

Westward extension

On May 15, 1820, Congress authorized an extension of the road to St. Louis, on the Mississippi River, and on March 3, 1825, across the Mississippi and to Jefferson City, Missouri. Work on the extension between Wheeling and Zanesville, Ohio, used the pre-existing Zane's Trace of old Ebenezer Zane, and was completed in 1833 to the new state capital of Columbus, Ohio, and in 1838 to the college town of Springfield, Ohio.

In 1849, a bridge was completed to carry the National Road across the Ohio River at Wheeling.

Transfer to states

Maintenance costs on the Cumberland Road were becoming more than Congress was willing to bear. In agreements with Maryland, Virginia, and Pennsylvania, the road was to be reconstructed and resurfaced. The section that ran over Haystack Mountain, just west of Cumberland, was abandoned and a new road was built through the Cumberland Narrows.

On April 1, 1835, the section from Wheeling to Cumberland was transferred to Maryland, Pennsylvania, and Virginia (now West Virginia). The last congressional appropriation was made May 25, 1838, and in 1840, Congress voted against completing the unfinished portion of the road, with the deciding vote being cast by Henry Clay. By that time, railroads were proving a better method of long-distance transportation, and the Baltimore and Ohio Railroad was being built west from Baltimore to Cumberland, mostly along the Potomac River, and then by a more direct route than the National Road across the Allegheny Plateau of West Virginia (then Virginia) to Wheeling. Construction of the National Road stopped in 1839. Much of the road through Indiana and Illinois remained unfinished and was transferred to the states.

Federal construction of the road stopped at Vandalia, Illinois, which at that time was the state's capital. Illinois officials decided not to continue construction without the federal funds because two state roads from Vandalia to the St. Louis area, today's US 40 and Illinois Route 140 (known then as the Alton Road), already existed.

Subsequent events

In 1912, the National Road was chosen to become part of the National Old Trails Road, which would extend further east to New York City and west to Los Angeles, California. Five Madonna of the Trail monuments, donated by the Daughters of the American Revolution, were erected along the Old Trails Road.

In 1927, the National Road was designated as the eastern part of US 40, which still generally follows the National Road's alignment with occasional bypasses, realignments, and newer bridges. The mostly parallel Interstate 70 (I-70) now provides a faster route for through travel without the many sharp curves, steep grades, and narrow bridges of US 40 and other segments of the National Road. Heading west from Hancock in western Maryland, I-70 takes a more northerly path to connect with and follow the Pennsylvania Turnpike (also designated as I-76) across the mountains between Breezewood and New Stanton, where I-70 turns west to rejoin the National Road's route (and US 40) near Washington, Pennsylvania.

The more recently constructed I-68 parallels the old road from Hancock through Cumberland west to Keyser's Ridge, Maryland, where the National Road and US 40 turn northwest into Pennsylvania, but I-68 continues directly west to meet I-79 near Morgantown, West Virginia. The portion of I-68 in Maryland is designated as the National Freeway.

Historical structures

Many of the National Road's original stone arch bridges also remain on former alignments, including:
 Casselman River Bridge near Grantsville, MarylandBuilt in 1813–1814 to carry the road across the Casselman River, it was the longest single-span stone arch bridge in America at the time. 
 Great Crossings Bridge near Confluence, Pennsylvania—built in 1818 to carry the road over the Youghiogheny River—the bridge, and the adjacent town of Somerfield, Pennsylvania (which was razed) are under the waters of Youghiogheny River Lake (though still visible at times of extremely low water levels).
Another remaining National Road bridge is the Wheeling Suspension Bridge at Wheeling, West Virginia. Opened in 1849 to carry the road over the Ohio River, it was the largest suspension bridge in the world until 1851, and is today the oldest vehicular suspension bridge in the United States still in use. A newer bridge now carries the realigned US 40 and I-70 across the river nearby.

Three of the road's original toll houses are preserved:
 La Vale Tollgate House, in La Vale, Maryland
 Petersburg Tollhouse, in Addison, Pennsylvania
 Searights Tollhouse, near Uniontown, Pennsylvania
Additionally, several Old National Pike Milestones—some well-maintained, others deteriorating, and yet others represented by modern replacements—remain intact along the route.

Route description

In general, the road climbed westwards along the Amerindian trail known as Chief Nemacolin's Path, once followed and improved by a young George Washington, then also followed by the Braddock Expedition. Using the Cumberland Narrows, its first phase of construction crossed the Allegheny Mountains entered southwestern Pennsylvania, reaching the Allegheny Plateau in Somerset County, Pennsylvania. There, travelers could turn off to Pittsburgh or continue west through Uniontown and reach navigable water, the Monongahela River, at Brownsville, Pennsylvania, which was by then a major outfitting center and riverboat-building emporium. Many settlers boarded boats there to travel down the Ohio and up the Missouri, or elsewhere on the Mississippi watershed.

Subsequent efforts pushed the road across the states of Ohio and Indiana and into the Illinois Territory. The western terminus of the National Road at its greatest extent was at the Kaskaskia River in Vandalia, Illinois, near the intersection of modern US 51 and US 40.

Today, travelers driving east from Vandalia travel along modern US 40 through south-central Illinois. The National Road continued into Indiana along modern US 40, passing through the cities of Terre Haute and Indianapolis. Within Indianapolis, the National Road used the original alignment of US 40 along West and East Washington Street (modern US 40 is now routed along I-465). East of Indianapolis, the road went through the city of Richmond before entering Ohio, where the road continued along modern US 40 and passed through the northern suburbs of Dayton, Springfield, and Columbus. 

West of Zanesville, Ohio, despite US 40's predominantly following the original route, many segments of the original road can still be found. Between Old Washington and Morristown, the original roadbed has been overlaid by I-70. The road then continued east across the Ohio River into Wheeling in West Virginia, the original western end of the National Road when it was first paved. After running  in West Virginia, the National Road then entered Pennsylvania. 

The road cut across southwestern Pennsylvania, heading southeast for about  before entering Maryland. East of Keyser's Ridge, the road used modern Alt US 40 to the city of Cumberland (modern US 40 is now routed along I-68). Cumberland was the original eastern terminus of the road. 

In the mid-19th century, a turnpike extension to Baltimore was approved—along what is now Maryland Route 144 from Cumberland to Hancock, US 40 from Hancock to Hagerstown, Alternate US 40 from Hagerstown to Frederick, and Maryland Route 144 from Frederick to Baltimore. The approval process was a hotly debated subject because of the removal of the original macadam construction that made this road famous.

The road's route between Baltimore and Cumberland continues to use the name National Pike or Baltimore National Pike and as Main Street in Ohio today, with various portions now signed as US 40, Alt. US 40, or Maryland Route 144. A spur between Frederick, Maryland, and Georgetown (Washington, D.C.), now Maryland Route 355, bears various local names, but is sometimes referred to as the Washington National Pike; it is now paralleled by I-270 between the Capital Beltway (I-495) and Frederick.

Millionaires' Row 
Nicknamed the "Main Street of America", the road's presence in towns on its route and effective access to surrounding towns attracted wealthy residents to build their houses along the road in towns such as in Richmond, Indiana, and Springfield, Ohio, creating Millionaires' Rows.

Historic designations

In 1976, the American Society of Civil Engineers designated the National Road as a National Historic Civil Engineering Landmark.

There are several structures associated with the National Road that are listed on the National Register of Historic Places.

Maryland
 Sixty-nine milestones in Maryland on Maryland Route 144 and Maryland Route 165, U.S. Route 40, U.S. Route 40 Alternate, and U.S. Route 40 Scenic
 Inns on the National Road in Cumberland, Maryland, and Grantsville, Maryland
 Casselman River Bridge near Grantsville, Maryland

Pennsylvania
The Pennsylvania Historical and Museum Commission has installed five historical markers noting the historic importance of the road: one in Somerset County on August 10, 1947, one in Washington County on April 1, 1949, and three in Fayette County on October 12, 1948, October 12, 1948, and May 19, 1996.
 Petersburg Tollhouse in Addison, Pennsylvania
 Mount Washington Tavern adjacent to the Fort Necessity National Battlefield in Wharton Township, Pennsylvania
 Searights Tollhouse, National Road, in Uniontown, Pennsylvania
 Dunlap's Creek Bridge, near Brownsville, Pennsylvania, the first cast iron arch bridge in the United States. Completed in 1839, it was designed by Richard Delafield and built by the United States Army Corps of Engineers. Still in use, the bridge is also a National Historic Civil Engineering Landmark.
 Claysville S Bridge in Washington County, Pennsylvania, near Claysville, Pennsylvania

West Virginia
 Mile markers 8, 9, 10, 11, 13, and 14 in West Virginia
 National Road Corridor Historic District in Wheeling, West Virginia
 Wheeling Suspension Bridge in Wheeling, West Virginia

Ohio 
 Peacock Road in Cambridge, Ohio
 The Red Brick Tavern in Lafayette, Madison County, Ohio, built in 1837

Indiana
 Hudleston Farmhouse Inn in Mount Auburn, Indiana
 James Whitcomb Riley House in Greenfield, Indiana

Illinois 
 Old Stone Arch, National Road, near Marshall, Illinois

Gallery

See also

 National Old Trails Road (Ocean-to-Ocean Highway)

References

Further reading

  restricted access

External links

 American Society of Civil Engineers landmark information
 National Road Association of Illinois – National Road in Illinois
 Indiana National Road Association – National Road in Indiana
 Ohio National Road Association – National Road in Ohio
 National Road in West Virginia  – by the West Virginia Department of Commerce
 National Road Heritage Corridor – National Road in Pennsylvania
 The National Old Trails Road Part 1: The Quest for a National Road
 Maryland's Bank Road (Baltimore to Cumberland)
 PRR Chronology
 The Historic National Road, from the America's Byways website of the Federal Highway Administration
 The National Old Trails Road Photo Gallery
 Ohio National Road driving tour
 
 
 125 M to B: The National Pike and National Road

 
All-American Roads
Historic trails and roads in the United States
Roads on the National Register of Historic Places
Historic Civil Engineering Landmarks
History of Cumberland, MD-WV MSA
Roads on the National Register of Historic Places in Ohio
Roads on the National Register of Historic Places in West Virginia
Roads on the National Register of Historic Places in Indiana
Roads on the National Register of Historic Places in Pennsylvania
Roads on the National Register of Historic Places in Maryland
U.S. Route 40
9th United States Congress
Scenic byways in Ohio
1811 establishments in the United States